The Illinois Confederation, also referred to as the Illiniwek or Illini, were made up of 12 to 13 tribes who lived in the Mississippi River Valley. Eventually member tribes occupied an area reaching from Lake Michicigao (Michigan) to Iowa, Illinois, Missouri, and Arkansas. The five main tribes were the Cahokia, Kaskaskia, Michigamea, Peoria, and Tamaroa. The tribes are estimated to have had tens of thousands of members, before the advancement of European contact in the 17th century that inhibited their growth and resulted in a marked decline in population.

The Illinois, like many Native American groups, sustained themselves through agriculture, hunting, and fishing. A partially nomadic group, the Illinois often lived in longhouses and wigwams, according to the season and resources that were available to them in the surrounding land. While the men usually hunted or participated in war, the women cultivated and processed their crops, created tools and clothing from game, and preserved food in various ways for storage and travel. Not officially a Confederation, the villages were led by one Great Chief. The villages had several chiefs who led each individual clan. The Illinois people eventually declined because of losses to infectious disease and war, mostly brought through the arrival of French colonists.

Eventually, they reorganized under the name of the Confederated Peoria. They are now known as the federally recognized "Peoria Tribe of Indians" and reside in present-day Oklahoma.

Name
French missionaries who documented their interactions with the tribes note that the people referred to themselves as the Inoka. The meaning of this word is unknown. Jacques Marquette, a French Jesuit missionary, claimed that Illinois was derived from Illini in their Algonquian language, meaning 'the men'. Louis Hennepin claimed the aforementioned men were a symbol of maturity and strength, and representative of the prime of a man's age.

In the 21st century, however, linguistic research demonstrates that ilinois derives indirectly from irenweewa, meaning 'he speaks in the ordinary way'. While the Ojibwa, who occupied neighboring areas around the eastern Great Lakes, pronunciation for this concept sounded to the French like, ilinwe. Ilinwe is the singular form of ilinwek. The French explorers who first heard it recorded it in various transliterated forms, such as "liniouek", "Aliniouek", and "Iliniouek".  The singular form evolved into the commonly known "Illinois".

History

Formation
The Illinois Confederation comprised 12 separate tribes who shared common language and culture. These tribes are the Kaskaskia, Cahokia, Peoria, Tamaroa, Moingwena, Michigamea, Chepoussa, Chinkoa, Coiracoentanon, Espeminkia, Maroa, Tapouara. Of these 12, only the Cahokia, Kaskaskia, Michigamea, Peoria, and Tamaora remain; others were lost as distinct tribes to disease and warfare. When the Illinois were first documented by Europeans in the 17th century, they were said to be a population of about 10,000 people. Although the number has significantly reduced, many of their descendants are today part of the Peoria Tribe of Miami, Oklahoma, as part of the merged Confederated Peoria Tribe.

Interactions with Europeans

It is thought that when the French first encountered the Illiniwek tribes, there were as many as 10,000 members living in a vast area stretching from Lake Michigan out to the heart of Iowa and as far south as Arkansas. In the 1670s, the French found a village of the Kaskaskia in the Illinois River valley (the later site of present-day Utica), a village of Peoria in present-day Iowa (near the later site of Keokuk), and a village of the Michigamea in northeast Arkansas.

The Kaskaskia village, also known as the Grand Village of the Illinois, was the largest and best-known village of the Illinois tribes. In 1675 the French established a Catholic mission, called the Mission of the Immaculate Conception of the Blessed Virgin, and a fur trading post near the village. The population increased to about 6,000 people in about 460 houses. Before long, however, Eurasian infectious diseases and the ongoing Beaver Wars brought high mortality to the Illiniwek, causing their population to plummet over the coming decades.

The French named the area Pays de Illinois, or "Illinois country", which came to be a common name in referring to the homeland of the Illinois. The early French explorers, including Louis Jolliet, Jacques Marquette and René-Robert Cavelier, Sieur de La Salle, produced accounts that documented the first discovery of the Illinois. Because of these developments, the Illinois tribes became well known to European explorers. European colonization, values, and religion began to affect the tribes.

In the late 17th century, the Iroquois, to expand their region and control the fur trade, forced the Kaskaskia and other Illinois out of their villages. They relocated to the south. Although the Illinois fought back against their primary enemy at the time, the wars scattered and killed many of their members. Eventually they reclaimed some of their lands.

In the early 1700s, the Illinois became involved in the conflict between the Meskwaki, also known as "Fox", and the French, known as the Fox Wars. In 1722, the Meskwaki attacked the Peoria for having killed the nephew of one of their chiefs, and forced them onto Starved Rock. The Peoria sent out messengers asking for help from the French, but by the time they reached the site, many of the Peoria warriors had been killed. The French and their Illini, Miami, Potawatomi and Sac allies continued to battle the Meskwaki, but were unsuccessful until 1730. That year they besieged a Fox village on the Sangamon River and conducted a brutal attack.

By the mid 1700s, the 12 or 13 tribes of the Confederation had dwindled to five: the Cahokia, Kaskaskia, Michigamea, Peoria, and Tamaroa. European diseases drastically reduced the numbers of the Illinois. The wars had arisen due to the conflicts between tribes for resources and trade goods, or were initiated by European explorers looking to expand their land. The remaining descendants of the Illinois Confederation have merged with the Peoria and are known as the Peoria Tribe of Indians and reside in Ottawa County, Oklahoma.

Dissolution
Some of the Illinois people's prominent enemies were the Lakota (Sioux), Osage, Pawnee, Sac and Fox Nation and Arikara to the west and the Quapaw, Shawnee, and Chickasaw to the south. Although these tribes were consistent threats, the Iroquois became the most pressing enemy of the Illinois beginning in the late 1600s. The Iroquois, looking for new hunting grounds after exhausting their own resources, killed or captured many Illinois people through their war parties. This capture of land and people eventually pushed the Illinois out of the Great Lakes region and into present-day Kansas. Other than the internal conflict among the tribes themselves, the Illinois also faced threat from European forces that stirred conflict with them and started wars, some of in which the Illinois were recruited as allies.

Additionally, with the expansion of European and Iroquois contact, the Illinois were exposed to a variety of new diseases that caused high mortality among them. Through war and foreign disease, the Illinois population drastically declined to a village of about 300 people by 1778. Pushed out by the Iroquois and Shawnee and facing more numerous European settlers, the Illinois accepted a reservation in 1832 at the Big Muddy River south of Kaskaskia. But within a few months, they ceded the rest of their territory and migrated in order to settle on a reservation in Eastern Kansas.

In 1854, the Illinois merged with the Wea and Piankashaw nations, renaming themselves as the Confederated Peoria Tribe. In 1867, they resettled in a new reservation in Northeast Oklahoma and were eventually joined by members of the Miami Tribe, who became an official part of their new confederation in 1873. Lasting about 50 years, the United Peoria and Miami Tribe dissolved in the 1920s. The remaining members of the Peoria Confederation reorganized, seeking federal recognition by the U.S. government, and were officially acknowledged by 1978. The remaining descendants of the Illinois Confederation are today found within the Peoria in Ottawa County, Oklahoma.

Culture

Language
Miami and Illinois are dialects of the same Algonquian language, spoken in Indiana and later Oklahoma. Though no native speakers of the language remain, language revival efforts are ongoing, and children from both the Miami and Peoria nations are learning to speak their ancestral language again. Miami-Illinois is a polysynthetic language with complex verb morphology and fairly free word order.

The Algonquian language is a North American Indian language family that was spoken in Canada, New England, the Atlantic coastal region, and the Great Lakes region, moving towards the Rocky Mountains. Although there are numerous Algonquian languages, such as Cree, Ojibwa, Blackfoot, and Cheyenne, the term "Algonquin" is employed to refer to the dialect of Ojibwa, which is used by the Illinois. Today, there are no native speakers of the language, although revival movements are making efforts to keep the language alive.

Gender
Like most Native American tribes, the men of the Illinois were mainly hunters and warriors while the women had domestic and agricultural roles. However, records show that some women also had positions of leadership, including those for ritualistic purposes.  Amidst a polygamous society, the first wives held superiority in their families, and held leadership roles in the household. Additionally, some women were shamans and priests, thus holding great power in the community. They enacted powers that could lead to death, and were thus both revered and feared by both men and women. Women were sometimes granted hunting tasks upon communal hunts, but were denied the use of any weapons, thus making it difficult to participate in this activity. Outside of religion, women could achieve status in the village through domestic activities and through harvest. Growing bountiful produce, raising many children, and being a faithful wife were signs that led to an elevated status as well as respect among the natives. Men, on the other hand, could receive status through their achievements in battle and demonstrating courage and bravery. The capacity of their hunting skills led to a greater number of wives, which also promised respect in the villages. Within these polygamous marriage, wives who were unfaithful were punished severely, sometimes by having parts of their face cut off.

Outside of stereotypical social roles, some Illinois men played out the roles of women, likening their appearance to them. These people were called the Ikoneta, and referred to by the French as berdache. Current ethnographers considers the Ikoneta to have been bisexual. While these roles were more deliberate, young boys that demonstrated feminine tendencies were brought up as girls in both outerwear and domestic roles. As according to culture, they were tattooed and taught the language patterns that were specific to women.

Religion
People of all social roles and positions were very religious, relying on spiritual guidance to dictate every aspect of their lives. Hunters depended on spirits in catching wild animals, warriors asked the spirits for guidance before warfare, and shamans were regularly employed to absolve matters concerning physical and mental health. However, with the arrival of the European missionaries in the late 1600s, Jesuit missions were established as a means to convert the Illinois to Christianity. While a great portion of the tribes eventually converted, some tribal elders rejected the religions and worked to retain their beliefs in the spirit world.

Traditions
The Illinois men and women practiced dream seeking, a ritual in which young boys and girls of about fifteen years of age would paint their face and isolate themselves to fast and pray as a means to reveal to them a specific spirit guardian upon which they would depend on to guide them for the rest of their lives. Called manitou, this vision quest was an important part of becoming an adult in the lives of the Illinois.

The Illinois had two burial procedures. One is the burial of bodies that were intact, and the other for burials of skeletons that were placed on scaffolds prior to the ceremony. Only people of the same gender and age of the dead person could participate as a part of their burial crew. For bodies that were intact, the cadavers were ceremonially dressed and placed in their grave along with funeral objects that would accompany them into the afterlife. A wooden cover is placed over their graves in order to prevent animals and environmental factors from disturbing the grave.

Society

Economy
The economy of the Illinois people was based on agriculture, hunting, and fishing. They depended heavily on agriculture, and generally had villages located near rivers where the soil was most fertile. Maize was the primary crop, but the Illinois also planted beans, squash, pumpkins, and watermelons, and gathered wild foods in the forests. Maize was planted in late spring and harvested prematurely in July, at which point most was preserved in order to prepare for the coming winter. The second harvest collected ripened maize, which were eaten during warmer months. Fish was plentiful in the Illinois river, but the Illinois generally did not rely on fishing as sustenance. Hunters primarily sought bison, which were also numerous in the northern Illinois prairies.  Hunting expeditions set out as individuals or groups, although sometimes in communal groups in which even women were able to participate. Annual bison hunts often necessitated groups of up to 300 people. In bison hunts, groups would split into several groups and surround the bison on foot. When in close proximity, the hunters would shoot their arrows and spears and force the animal in the opposite direction, towards the rest of the hunting party. The women had the task of butchering the bison and would preserve the meat by drying and heating it in order to prepare for the winter, when hunting was not possible.

At the time of European contact, the Illinois economy was largely self-sufficient. In the course of their yearly activities, the Illinois people produced virtually all of the foodstuffs and other material products they needed to maintain their way of life. However, the Illinois also participated in an extensive trading network. In exchange for hides, furs, and human slaves obtained from tribes living to their south and west, the Illinois traded with Great Lakes tribes and French traders for guns and other European goods. As time passed, traders and missionaries began to settle among the Illinois and their formerly self-sufficient economy became increasingly dependent upon their French allies.

The Illinois seasonally lived in wigwams and longhouses, depending on the weather and the resources available to them. Like most other tribes, they lived in villages with dwellings that were occupied by a number of different families.

Warfare
In the beginning of February, war chiefs of each tribes organized raids against enemies, who included the Pawnee and the Quapaw, and later on, the five tribes of the Iroquois Confederacy. Prior to each battle, 20 warriors were invited by the war chief to a feast, in which the men would pray to their manitou for strengths such as speed and endurance when fighting in battle. For campaigns involving larger numbers of enemies, war parties involving both men and women were organized in the villages. To the Illinois, capturing of prisoners was preferred over death, although some prisoners were eventually killed or forced into slavery. The Illinois preferred arrows and spears over guns, finding them slower than the use of their own weapons. The noise of guns was sometimes employed against other tribal nations that had never before seen or heard such a weapon to frighten them before battle.

Government 
Although specific dates are unknown, the Illinois Confederation had at one time been one large nation without any divisions of smaller tribes. They were divided into smaller groups once their population proved to be too large to meet effective hunting and agricultural needs. But even after the split, all the tribes maintained a strong sense of unification as one nation of the Illini. The structures of authority are set out to have one central authority, called the Great Chief, and Chiefs under him that lead each individual tribe. One such Great Chief that is noteworthy in European history is Mamantouensa, who even traveled to France. Direct political leadership was established and maintained by peace chiefs, who were in charge of organizing communal hunting expeditions and communicating with leaders of other tribes. Although highly respected, peace chiefs did not have the authority of village chiefs, and made decisions that were enforced through persuasion over force. War chiefs had the power to plan and lead raids on other tribes. These roles were not inherited, but could be achieved through a demonstration of great battle skills, as well as through convincing the other warriors that his manitou could guide them into a successful raid. For those who died in the battle, it was the war chief's role to compensate the families of the deceased through gifts and lead another raid against those who killed the warrior as a means to enact vengeance. Primarily only men were allowed to be chiefs, although women sometimes had leadership roles in the community as village chiefs.

Though chiefs had the authority of political power and were widely respected by the people, the egalitarian society of the Ilinois presented a more democratic environment in which important decisions that effected the community were made by tribal consensus. It was only through the expansion of European ideals and direct contact with French officials that influenced the chiefs to wield greater power over their people. By the 1760s, the rise of a new chief had to be approved by colonial authorities.

Because a true confederation refers to different groups of people who, although linked as one nation, are culturally distinct, the Illinois, in the direct definition of the word, are more a segmented tribe rather than a confederation. They share a common language and are culturally similar throughout their tribes. Instead of having multiple individual tribe leaders that assume full authority, the Illinois also had one Grand Chief that centralized power over all of the tribes.

Settlements
There are conflicting reports as to the number of villages and populations of the Illinois, both among the tribes and as a whole. When Europeans first documented the nation, the Illinois had villages along the Mississippi and Illinois River and a population of about eight or nine thousand. However, another report counts only five villages and about two thousand people. The former is considered to be a more accurate representation, and the Illinois are said to number 10,500 people at the time of European contact.

See also

Grand Village of the Illinois
Nikinapi

Notes

References

 Costa, David J. 2000. "Miami-Illinois Tribe Names". In John Nichols, ed., Papers of the Thirty-first Algonquian Conference 30-53. Winnipeg: University of Manitoba.
 Costa, David J. 2008. "On the Origins of the Name "Illinois"." Le Journal 24/4: 6-10.

Further reading

External links
Some Account of the Indian Tribes Formerly Inhabiting Indiana and Illinois
The Illinois - State Museum of Illinois
Tribes of the Illinois/Missouri Region at First
The Tribes of The Illinois Confederacy
Peoria Tribe of Indians of Oklahoma
Lenville J. Stelle, Inoca Ethnohistory Project: Eye Witness Descriptions of the Contact Generation, 1667 - 1700

 
Great Lakes tribes
Algonquian peoples
Native American history of Illinois
Native American history of Indiana
Native American history of Michigan
Native American history of Wisconsin
History of the Midwestern United States
Former confederations
Native American tribes in Illinois
Native American tribes